This is a list of current and former official residences of governors in the United States. Every U.S. State has at least one official residence, with the exception of 5 states; Arizona, Idaho, Massachusetts, Vermont and Rhode Island. Also included is a list of unofficial but notable governors' residences.

Current and former official residences

See also
List of residences of presidents of the United States
List of university and college presidents' houses in the United States

References

Historic sites in the United States
Lists of government buildings in the United States